"Bad as the Boys" is a song by Swedish singer-songwriter Tove Lo featuring Finnish singer Alma, released on 2 August 2019 as the second single from her fourth album Sunshine Kitty. It marks Lo and Alma's third collaboration, following their feature on Charli XCX's 2017 single "Out of My Head" and the remix of Lo's 2018 single "Bitches".

Recording and promotion
The song was recorded at MXM Studios in Los Angeles, USA, House Mouse Studios in Stockholm, Sweden and Fried Studios in Helsinki, Finland.
Lo announced the song in a clip posted to social media on 30 July, showing herself singing a portion of the song a cappella as the lyrics appear onscreen. The following day, Lo revealed the first four tracks of Sunshine Kitty, with "Bad as the Boys" as track three.

Critical reception
"Bad as the Boys" received generally positive reviews, with critics praising its production and lyrics. Mike Wass of Idolator called the track "a banger" and "every bit as good as the preview suggested". Billboard writer Stephen Daw said the song is "a light, summertime bop".

Charts

References

2019 singles
2019 songs
Tove Lo songs
Alma (Finnish singer) songs
Songs written by Tove Lo
Songs written by Ludvig Söderberg
Songs written by Jakob Jerlström